Alex De Carolis (born 24 September 1992) is a Canadian professional soccer player who plays as a defender for Swedish club IFK Eskilstuna.

Club career

Early career
De Carolis began playing soccer in Sarnia with local clubs Bluewater SC and Sarnia Fury. From 2012 to 2015, De Carolis attended Canisius College and in 2014 played for Premier Development League side FC London. In 2015, he played for Seattle Sounders FC U-23 and made the semi-finals of the PDL Championship.

In February 2016, De Carolis signed with Swedish Division 3 side Nora BK.

Västerås SK
On 7 March 2017, De Carolis signed with Swedish Division 1 side Västerås SK. That season, he made fourteen league appearances for Västerås, scoring two goals.

Umeå FC
On 24 January 2018, De Carolis signed with Swedish Division 1 side Umeå FC. He made 23 appearances for Umeå that season, including nine starts.

HFX Wanderers
On 20 February 2019, De Carolis returned to Canada and signed with Canadian Premier League side HFX Wanderers. He made his debut on 11 May, in a 1–0 loss to Valour FC. In November 2020, De Carolis and the Wanderers agreed to mutually part ways.

IFK Eskilstuna
On 14 March 2021, De Carolis returned to Sweden, signing with Division 2 side IFK Eskilstuna.

Honours
HFX Wanderers
 Canadian Premier League
Runners-up: 2020

References

External links

Alex De Carolis at Lagstatistik

1992 births
Living people
Association football defenders
Canadian soccer players
Soccer people from Ontario
Sportspeople from Sarnia
Canadian people of Italian descent
Canadian expatriate soccer players
Expatriate soccer players in the United States
Canadian expatriate sportspeople in the United States
Expatriate footballers in Sweden
Canadian expatriate sportspeople in Sweden
Canisius Golden Griffins men's soccer players
Seattle Sounders FC U-23 players
Västerås SK Fotboll players
Umeå FC players
HFX Wanderers FC players
IFK Eskilstuna players
USL League Two players
Division 3 (Swedish football) players
Division 2 (Swedish football) players
Ettan Fotboll players
Canadian Premier League players